I Am the West is the ninth studio album by American rapper Ice Cube. It was released on September 28, 2010 by Lench Mob Records and EMI.

Background
Ice Cube said this album would be different from any one of his others, having a different direction. The album was released independently under his label Lench Mob. Ice Cube stated that "being independent is beautiful because we can do things 'out the box' that record companies would usually frown at. Instead of working from a ready-made cookie-cutter marketing plan, we can tailor make a marketing plan specifically for me".
 
In an interview with Baller Status, Ice Cube spoke on two songs that were going to be on the album, "Man vs. Machine" and "Hood Robbin". "'Man vs. Machine' is talking about our obsessions with machinery and how it's taking over. Automation is taking over human beings in all our relevancy in this world. Pretty soon, machines are gonna take over and that's just real...['Hood Robbin'] is talking about how big corporations is now stealing from the poor and giving to the rich. It's a whole thing about the things we're going up against with housing and medical insurance ... just everything people are going through. Real shit that ain't got nothing to do with money, cars, and all the shit most rappers talk about."

Young Maylay made guest appearances on the album. Ice Cube confirmed that Dr. Dre would no longer be on the album in August.
He received beats from West coast veteran producers such as DJ Quik, Dr. Dre, E-A-Ski, and Sir Jinx, not having worked on a solo album with the latter in nearly 20 years.

I Am The West, like several previous Ice Cube/Westside Connection albums, features interludes by Keith David.

Singles
The album's lead single "I Rep That West", was released on April 25, 2010. The album's second single "Drink the Kool-Aid", was released on July 27, 2010. The album's third single "She Couldn't Make It On Her Own" featuring Doughboy and OMG, was released on August 31, 2010. A music video for "Too West Coast" (produced by Hallway Productionz) was released on October 5, 2010.

Reception
Early reviews perceived to be generally positive gaining a 62% out of 100 in Metacritic. Jeff Weiss from The L.A. Times music blog gave it 2 and a half out of 4 stars stating "Even the greatest can use a little help from their friends, and all too often this feels like how the West was one-dimensional."
Allmusic reviewer David Jeffries said "I Am the West shows the younger generation how to cross 40 while retaining their freedom and baller status. Middle age hip-hop is born here, and if the game follows his lead, it will be one monster of a genre. "

Commercial performance
The album debuted at #22 on the Billboard 200 and sold 22,000 copies in its 1st week.

Track listing

Charts

Weekly charts

Year-end charts

References

2010 albums
Ice Cube albums
Albums produced by Bangladesh (record producer)
Albums produced by Tha Bizness